Roberto Molina Carrasco (born 5 June 1960) is a Spanish sailor and Olympic champion. He won gold medal in the 470 class at the 1984 Summer Olympics in Los Angeles, together with Luis Doreste.

Notes

References

External links
 
 
 
 

1960 births
Living people
Spanish male sailors (sport)
Olympic gold medalists for Spain
Olympic medalists in sailing
Olympic sailors of Spain
Sailors at the 1984 Summer Olympics – 470
Medalists at the 1984 Summer Olympics
Real Club Náutico de Gran Canaria sailors
20th-century Spanish people